Edmund Mann Pope (February 21, 1837 – June 5, 1906) was an American businessman and politician.

Pope was born in Penfield, Monroe County, New York and went to the public schools. Pope served in the 8th New York Cavalry Regiment during the American Civil War and was commissioned a brigadier general. In 1873, he moved to Minnesota and settled in Mankato, Blue Earth County, Minnesota with his wife and family. Pope worked as a merchant. He served in the Minnesota Senate from 1887 to 1890 and was a Democrat. He died in Grand Marais, Cook County, Minnesota.

References

1837 births
1906 deaths
People from Penfield, New York
Politicians from Mankato, Minnesota
Businesspeople from Minnesota
People of New York (state) in the American Civil War
Democratic Party Minnesota state senators